Sunny Afternoon is a jukebox musical with music and lyrics by Ray Davies and a book by Joe Penhall. Based on the formation and career of the English rock band The Kinks, the musical was commissioned and produced by Sonia Friedman and made its world premiere in 2014 at the Hampstead Theatre, London, before transferring to the West End's Harold Pinter Theatre. Featuring songs by The Kinks, Sunny Afternoon includes their hits such as "Lola", "Waterloo Sunset", "You Really Got Me" and the musical's title song, "Sunny Afternoon".

Background
On 13 December 2013, producer Sonia Friedman officially confirmed that a musical based around the early life of Ray Davies and the formation of the band The Kinks would receive its world premiere at the Hampstead Theatre in spring 2014. The musical was named after the band's 1966 hit single "Sunny Afternoon," and features songs from the band's back catalogue. The musical has a book by Joe Penhall and is directed by Edward Hall, with choreography by Adam Cooper, set and costume design by Miriam Buether, lighting design by Rick Fisher, sound design by Matt McKenzie and musical direction by Elliott Ware.

Production history

Original London production (2014-16) 
The show's premiere production began previews at the Hampstead Theatre in London, on 14 April 2014, with its official opening night on 1 May, booking for a limited run until 24 May 2014.

In late June, it was confirmed that the production would transfer to the West End, beginning previews at the Harold Pinter Theatre on 4 October, with an official opening night on 28 October 2014. Tickets for the transfer went on sale on 30 June. Shortly after beginning previews the show extended booking to January, before quickly announcing another extension to 23 May 2015. On 14 November 2014, the cast appeared on the BBC's Children In Need, closing the show. The musical closed on 29 October 2016.

A typical performance runs two hours and 45 minutes, including one interval.

UK and Ireland tour (2016-17) 
The production embarked on its first UK and Ireland tour opening at the Manchester Opera House in August 2016 ending at the Grand Opera House, Belfast in June 2017.

A second UK and Ireland tour was due to open again at the Manchester Opera House in August 2020, however due to the COVID-19 pandemic was cancelled.

Synopsis
The semi-biographical story is set against the background of political and social change of the 1960s. The musical examines the early years of the Muswell Hill, London-based group The Kinks. After initial failure, the band's lead guitarist Dave Davies experimented and created a distorted power chord sound on the group's third single, "You Really Got Me". The song, written by Dave's older brother Ray, went to No 1 in the UK charts and preceded a string of hits. Woven into the musical are the themes of the Davies brothers' sibling rivalry, management problems, their sister's untimely death, Ray's doomed marriage and their subsequent banning from the United States following a dispute with the musicians' union.

Music

Musical numbers

Act I
"You Still Want Me"
"I Gotta Move/You Really Got Me"
"Just Can't Go To Sleep"
"Denmark Street"
"A Well Respected Man"
"Dead End Street"
"Dedicated Follower of Fashion"
"You Really Got Me"
"(This Time Tomorrow into) Set Me Free"
"Till the End of the Day"
"This Strange Effect"
"Tell Me Now So I'll Know" (Instrumental)
"Stop Your Sobbing"
"This is Where I Belong"
"Where Have All the Good Times Gone/All Day and All of the Night"

Act II
"This Time Tomorrow"
 "Maximum Consumption"
"Sitting in My Hotel"
"I Go to Sleep"
"I'm Not Like Everybody Else"
"Too Much On My Mind/Tired of Waiting"
"The Moneygoround"
"Sunny Afternoon"
"A Rock 'N' Roll Fantasy"
"Days"
"A Long Way From Home"
"Waterloo Sunset"
"Lola"
"All Day and All of the Night/You Really Got Me/Lola"

Recordings
On 21 October 2014, four preview tracks from the album, "Dedicated Follower of Fashion", "Dead End Street", "Too Much On My Mind/Tired of Waiting" and the show's title song "Sunny Afternoon" were released via SoundCloud. Recorded at London's Konk Studio's, which was established by The Kinks, the album featuring 29 songs, was released on 27 October via BMG Chrysalis.

Principal roles and original cast

Awards and nominations

Original London production

References

External links

2014 musicals
West End musicals
The Kinks
Laurence Olivier Award-winning musicals
Musicals inspired by real-life events
British musicals
Jukebox musicals
Rock musicals
Musicals set in London